This is a list of players named to participate in the women's basketball competition at the Games of the XXX Olympiad.

Group A

The following is the Angola roster in the women's basketball tournament of the 2012 Summer Olympics.

The following is the China roster in the women's basketball tournament of the 2012 Summer Olympics.

The following is the Croatia roster in the women's basketball tournament of the 2012 Summer Olympics.

The following is the Czech Republic roster in the women's basketball tournament of the 2012 Summer Olympics.

The following is the Turkey roster in the women's basketball tournament of the 2012 Summer Olympics.

The following is the United States roster in the women's basketball tournament of the 2012 Summer Olympics.

Group B

The following was the Australia roster in the women's basketball tournament of the 2012 Summer Olympics.

The following is the Brazil roster in the women's basketball tournament of the 2012 Summer Olympics.

The following is the Canada roster in the women's basketball tournament of the 2012 Summer Olympics.

The following is the France roster in the women's basketball tournament of the 2012 Summer Olympics.

The following is the Great Britain roster in the women's basketball tournament of the 2012 Summer Olympics.

The following is the Russia roster in the women's basketball tournament of the 2012 Summer Olympics.

References

squads
2012